Stanmore is a suburb in the Inner West of Sydney, in New South Wales, Australia 6 kilometres south west of the Sydney central business district. It is part of the local government area of the Inner West Council. It is known for its long strip of shops running along Parramatta Road (Great Western Highway).

History
Prior to settlement by the British the site was populated by coastal aborigines known as the Gadigal clan of the Eora people. Land in the present Stanmore area was first allocated to colonial officers by Governor Arthur Phillip between 1793 and 1810.

Stanmore was named by a saddler, John Jones, who settled on the land in 1835 where Newington College now stands and called it the Stanmore Estate. Jones named it after his birthplace of Stanmore, now a north-west suburb of London. Thomas Rowley owned Kingston Farm which occupied the eastern half of Stanmore and much of Newtown, and a portion of George Johnston's Annandale Farm estate covered the area south of Parramatta Road containing Annandale House built in 1799 on the hill between Macaulay and Albany Roads.  Johnston marched from here with his troops to Castle Hill on 5 March 1804 to quell the convict revolt. He also rode from here on 26 January 1808 to arrest Governor William Bligh during the Rum Rebellion. Johnston planted the first Norfolk pines on the Australian mainland along the line of Percival Road, leading to Parramatta Road.

Stanmore Road was constructed in 1835 and early development occurred in this area. In 1855, the railway divided Stanmore into areas known as North and West Kingston north of the railway, and South Kingston south of the railway. The Kingston Farm had been sold to James Holt in 1835, and North Kingston was subdivided in 1854. South Kingston (between the railway and Stanmore Road) was slowly subdivided from 1857 with isolated large houses built between 1860 and 1870.  It was not until the late 19th century that the name Stanmore came into more regular use, replacing Kingston. Municipal boundaries established in 1861 and 1871 placed most of Stanmore into the Municipality of Petersham, with the area south of Stanmore Rd placed into the Municipality of Marrickville. In 1878, Stanmore railway station was established and the streets west of Percival Road were laid out. More intensive development subsequently occurred in this area and the name Stanmore slowly moved northwards from Stanmore to Parramatta Roads. Stanmore became a desirable location, booming in the 1880s and 1890s with the opening of Newington College and the Percival Road shopping area. The naming of streets after English colonies between Derby and Stafford streets reflected the English values of the time. The final subdivision of Johnston's South Annandale estate took place in 1905, and building was not completed until 1916-1918. Annandale House was demolished in 1905, and Weekley Park was established on land donated by the Johnston family.

A small amount of light industry was established in the early 1920s in the area close to Parramatta Road, including H. Small and Co., a chocolate maker opening in 1928, and Starkeys Cordials. Both establishments have since closed and their premises have been converted into offices and apartments.

Heritage listings 
Stanmore has several heritage-listed sites, including:
 37 Cavendish Street: New South Wales Aboriginal Education Consultative Group Office
 125 Corunna Road: Corunna Road Sewer Vent and Cottage
 Great Southern and Western railway: Stanmore railway station

Population
In the 2021 census, Stanmore had a population of 7,619 people, 68.3% of whom were born in Australia. The next most common countries of birth were England 4.6%, New Zealand 2.1%, Portugal 1.4%, China (excludes SARs and Taiwan) 1.2% and Greece 1.2%. The most common responses for religion in Stanmore (NSW) were No Religion, 54.0%, Catholic 18.9%, Not stated 5.2%, Anglican 6.0% and Eastern Orthodox 4.6%. 76% of households only spoke English at home. 25.4% of households were non-English speaking. The top responses for languages used at home (other than English) were Greek 2.5% Spanish 1.9% Italian 1.8% Portuguese 1.6% and Mandarin 1.5%.

In the 2016 census, there were 7,938 people living in Stanmore, while in the 2011 census the number was 7,702.

Commercial area and transport
Stanmore railway station is on the Inner West & Leppington Line of the Sydney Trains network. Stanmore has a small shopping centre beside Stanmore railway station. Commercial developments also run along the length of Parramatta Road.

Schools

Stanmore is home to Newington College, an independent GPS boys school, the state primary Stanmore Public School and Saint Michael's Catholic Primary School Stanmore.

Both Newington and Stanmore Public are of heritage significance and the main buildings of distinguished designs. Of Newington's design by Thomas Rowe the architectural historian Morton Herman said: 

Of Stanmore Public School's design by Blackmann and Parkes Herman said:

Sport and recreation
Apart from the private facilities at Newington College, sporting and recreation facilities in Stanmore are limited to a handful of small parks and playgrounds including Weekley Park, Crammond Park and Montague Gardens. Stanmore does lend its name, however, to the Stanmore Hawks soccer club which plays in the NSW State League Division One, the third tier of senior soccer in Sydney.

Churches
Churches in Stanmore include St Michael The Archangel Catholic Church, and Stanmore Baptist Church.

Notable people

Notable people from or who have lived in Stanmore include:
 Sid Barnes (1916–1973), Test cricketer
 Sir Garfield Barwick (1903–1997), 7th Chief Justice of Australia, raised in Stanmore 
 Vivian Gordon Bowden (1884–1942), businessman and diplomat, born in Stanmore 
 Euphemia Bridges Bowes (1816–1900), suffragette and social activist, lived in Stanmore
 Nicholas Brown (b. 1980), actor, singer-songwriter, screenwriter 
 Matt Doran (b. 1976), actor
 Thelma Forshaw (1923–1995), writer, journalist, attended St Michael's Catholic School
 Tom Frame (b.1962), Anglican bishop, historian, academic, born in Stanmore
 Richard Gill AO (1941−2018), Conductor and musical education advocate lived in Stanmore
 John Gowing (1835–1908), Gowings founder, lived in Stanmore
 William Parker Henson (1905–1999), Chairman Sydney County Council, born in Stanmore
 Harold Holt (1908–1967), 17th Prime Minister of Australia, born in Stanmore 
 Amy Mathews (b.1979), Home and Away actress
 Gwen Plumb (1912–2002), actress, born in Stanmore 
 Leigh Sales (b. 1973), ABC Journalist
 Frank Stanmore (1929−2005), rugby league player, lived in Stanmore

References

External links

 Stanmore Baptist Church Website
Olympia Milk Bar, Parramatta Road, Stanmore
 Marrickville Heritage Society
 Official Newtown, Stanmore Government Website
  [CC-By-SA]

 
Suburbs of Sydney
Inner West